Pedro Nuno de Oliveira Santos (São João da Madeira, São João da Madeira, born April 13, 1977) is an economist, politician and Portuguese minister of the Socialist Party.

He has a degree in economics from ISEG-UTL.

He was secretary general of Socialist Youth, from 2004 to 2008. He was a member of the Assembly of the Republic in the 10th and 12th Legislatures. He was the Secretary of State for Parliamentary Affairs, from November 2015 to February 2019.

In February 2019 he was appointed Minister of Infrastructure and Housing, a position he held in the XXII and XXIII Constitutional Governments.

Early life and career
Santos is the son of Maria Augusta Leite de Oliveira Santos and Américo Augusto dos Santos, entrepreneur of the Tecmacal group, in the footwear and industrial equipment sector, from São João da Madeira, and for some time councilor for the PS in the Chamber Municipal of that city.

In the associative field, he was President of the Student Association of the Dr. Serafim Leite Secondary School, in São João da Madeira, chairman of the Board of the General Meeting of Students (RGA) of the Superior Institute of Economics and Management of the Technical University of Lisbon and Member of the Directorate of the Student Association of the same, where he graduated in Economics.

Political career
Santos served a term as President of the Parish Assembly of São João da Madeira, Deputy of the Municipal Assembly of São João da Madeira, President of the Aveiro Federation of Socialist Youth and General Secretary of Socialist Youth (2004-2008).

He was a Deputy in the 10th and 12th Legislature, having been, in the last Legislature, responsible for the Economy Commission and the Parliamentary Inquiry Commission into the BES case and was vice-president of the Socialist Party Parliamentary Group and member of the Permanent Commission of the Assembly of the Republic. He was President of the Federation of Aveiro of the Socialist Party.

Secretary of State for Parliamentary Affairs, 2015–2019
In António Costa's first government, Santos held the position of Secretary of State for Parliamentary Affairs and was responsible for coordinating the parties that formed the governing solution known as "geringonça" and that joined the Socialist Party, the Communist Party, the Left Bloc and Ecologist Party "The Greens".

Santos has asserted himself as a possible candidate for PS leader, in succession to António Costa.

Minister of Infrastructure and Housing, 2019–2022
Santos served as Minister of Infrastructure and Housing in the XXII Constitutional Government.

The investment in the railroad has been at the center of his concerns and since he took office there have been several investments made in this area, starting with the implementation of Railroad 2020. At CP, he has been responsible for a new plan for the recovery of rolling stock, which has allowed to put into service dozens of carriages and locomotives parked for many years.

He was the face of the solution found to save TAP, through public support approved in Brussels, in the amount of 1.2 billion euros, which allowed the State to keep 72.5% of the national airline. This support was equivalent to that given to all other national companies.

He has been a supporter of the construction of the new Lisbon airport at Montijo, and in the face of opposition from the Seixal and Moita municipalities to this work, he came to affirm that the law that gives this power to municipalities should be changed.

In December 2022 Santos stepped down from his post, following a public backlash over a hefty severance pay a secretary of state received from state-owned airline TAP, which fell under his remit.

Political positions
Santos is one of the faces on the left wing of the PS, even attending the Avante! Festival, although he has already said in an interview that “before there was a left wing in the PS, today there is a small right wing. Since the time he was JS leader, Santos has defended understandings between the parties of the Portuguese left.

In December 2011, a PS Christmas dinner at White Castle, Santos suggested that Portugal could threaten not to pay its sovereign debt in those situations, and advocated that the government should question the demands of international creditors, including bankers Germans, or renegotiate the debt to save the Portuguese from the sacrifices of austerity. Ironically, he had been decorated two years earlier by the German Government itself.

Recognition
Grand Cross of Merit of the Order of Merit of the Federal Republic of Germany (May 26, 2009)

Personal life
Santos is 1.88 m tall and is the boyfriend of Ana Catarina Gamboa, Chief of Staff of the Assistant Secretary of State and Parliamentary Affairs.

References

1977 births
Living people
Socialist Party (Portugal) politicians
Members of the Assembly of the Republic (Portugal)
Government ministers of Portugal
Recipients of the Order of Merit of the Federal Republic of Germany